Alyson Vinícius Almeida Neves (born 5 April 1996), simply known as Alyson, is a Brazilian footballer who plays as a left back for EC Água Santa.

Career statistics

References

External links

1996 births
Living people
Footballers from São Paulo
Brazilian footballers
Association football defenders
Campeonato Brasileiro Série A players
Campeonato Brasileiro Série B players
Campeonato Brasileiro Série C players
Tanabi Esporte Clube players
Sport Club Atibaia players
Atlético Cajazeirense de Desportos players
Botafogo Futebol Clube (PB) players
Sampaio Corrêa Futebol Clube players
Oeste Futebol Clube players
Ceará Sporting Club players
Esporte Clube Juventude players